Clinton is a red variety of hybrid grape. Its phylloxera resistance led to its being planted in small amounts in the eastern Alps, although it imparts a pronounced foxiness and dark red colour to wine made from its juice.

History
Clinton is a spontaneous cross between the North American species Vitis riparia and Vitis labrusca. The first seedling was found in New York State by Hugh White in 1835. After phylloxera arrived in Europe, it was planted in northern Italy, Switzerland and Austria.

Distribution and wines
It is grown in Brazil, France, and Italian Switzerland. In Austria it is one of the hybrid grapes used in Uhudler wines. 
In France it is illegal to sell commercially. In Italy it is known as Clinton, and is sometimes confused with the vitis x labruscana variety Isabella, known as "Fragola" (strawberry) in Italy. Ubriaco al Fragola Clinto is a Veneto cheese rubbed with the must of Fragola and Clinton.

Vine and viticulture
It is a vigorous and early-maturing variety with small, black berries. It is very resistant to phylloxera.

Synonyms
Bacchus Black (though unrelated to Bacchus,) Clinton Rose, Plant Des Carmes, Plant Pouzin, Vorthington, Worthington, Zephirin, Clinto, Erdbeerer, Fragola.

References

Further reading

External links
 VIVC Bibliography

Red wine grape varieties
Hybrid grape varieties